Muirchertach Ua Carmacáin, Bishop of Clonfert, 1195-1203.

Ó Cormacáin was a member of an ecclesiastical family based in Síol Anmchadha, in what is now south-east County Galway. Later members of the family were bishops of Clonfert and Archbishop of Tuam, as well as Abbots of the abbey of Abbeygormican in that county.

See also

 Uilliam Ó Cormacáin
 Henry Ó Cormacáin

References
 http://www.ucc.ie/celt/published/T100005C/
 https://archive.org/stream/fastiecclesiaehi04cottuoft#page/n17/mode/2up
 http://www.irishtimes.com/ancestor/surname/index.cfm?fuseaction=Go.&UserID=
 The Surnames of Ireland, Edward MacLysaght, 1978.

People from County Galway
Medieval Gaels from Ireland
12th-century Roman Catholic bishops in Ireland
13th-century Roman Catholic bishops in Ireland
Bishops of Clonfert